Serhiy Volodymyrovych Sukhanov (born 6 April 1995) is a Ukrainian professional footballer who plays as a right back.

Career
In February 2023 he moved to Obolon Kyiv.

References

External links
 Profile on Obolon Kyiv official website
 

1995 births
Living people
People from Okhtyrka
Ukrainian footballers
Association football defenders
FC Naftovyk-Ukrnafta Okhtyrka players
FC Polissya Zhytomyr players
FC Hirnyk-Sport Horishni Plavni players
FC Obolon-Brovar Kyiv players
FC Chornomorets Odesa players
Ukrainian First League players
Ukrainian Second League players
Sportspeople from Sumy Oblast